The 2005 season of the Chinese Taipei National Football League.

League table

Results

Round 1

Round 2

Round 3

Round 4

Round 5

Round 6

Round 7

Round 8

Round 9

Round 10

Round 11

Round 12

Round 13

Round 14

Top goalscorers

All-star team 
The following players were voted to be the greatest players in the 2005 season of the Chinese Taipei National Football League:
 Goalkeeper: Lu Kun-chi (Taiwan PE College)
 Right back: Tu Chu-hsien (Taipower)
 Left back: Chen Jeng-i (Tatung)
 Center backs: Lee Meng-chian (Taipower), Ju Wen-bin (Tatung)
 Right midfielder: Chang Fu-hsian (Ming Chuan)
 Left midfielder: Chuang Wei-lun (Tatung)
 Defensive midfielder: Tsai Hui-kai (Tatung)
 Attacking midfielder: Tseng Tai-lin (Ming Chuan)
 Strikers: Huang Wei-yi (Tatung), Ho Ming-tsan (Taipower)

References

External links 
 Results on RSSSF
  Season goalscorers

Chinese Taipei National Football League seasons
Chinese Taipei
Chinese Taipei
1